The Community of True Inspiration, also known as the True Inspiration Congregations, Inspirationalists, and the Amana Church Society) is a Radical Pietist group of Christians descending from settlers of German, Swiss, and Austrian descent who settled in West Seneca, New York, after purchasing land from the Seneca peoples' Buffalo Creek Reservation. They were from a number of backgrounds and socioeconomic areas and later moved to Amana, Iowa, when they became dissatisfied with the congestion of Erie County and the growth of Buffalo, New York.

History

Inspirés 

From the time of the Edict of Nantes in 1598 until 1685, France had permitted Calvinist Protestants, known as Huguenots, to practice their religion and exercise the full rights of citizens while still maintaining Roman Catholicism as the state religion. However, in 1685, King Louis XIV of France issued the Edict of Fontainebleau which ordered that Huguenot church buildings and schools be closed, and sought to suppress the religion. The  ("Inspired") were Huguenots in Southern France who radicalized following their suppression and begun an itinerant ministry preaching the end time was at hand with claims of prophetic inspiration. They spent the remainder of the 17th century traveling throughout the Netherlands and England as refugees, before many of them settled in the Pietist center of Halle.

Pott brothers 

The  influenced three brothers surnamed Pott who lived in Halle until they were exiled and went to Hanau and Wetteravia east of Frankfurt in 1714. The Pott brothers were several of many Pietists who had come to the area to take advantage of the religious tolerance of the counts of Isenburg-Eisenberg. There, they gave what many understood as divinely-inspired ecstatic speeches in a trance-like state. They sometimes experienced uncontrollable jolting motions of their entire bodies while they were preaching, which was understood as verification that they were seized by a divine spirit. Their message was a call to repentance and awakening.

Early Inspirationalist movement 

Many were drawn to the Potts, and the group that gathered around them emerged as a distinct group in the late autumn of 1714. This group is known as the Inspirationalists. Soon, others began preaching in a similar style and experienced similar convulsions. Among these other early leaders were Eberhard Ludwig Gruber, Johann Friedrich Rock, and Ursula Meyer of Thun.

Everywhere the Inspirés and Inspirationalists went, communities gathered around them. However, political freedom was very limited in this era, and the Inspirationalists were routinely banished and were unable to find a place in Europe they could permanently settle. Their religious practices, including avoidance of military service and refusal to take an oath, kept them in conflict with German authorities. Many of these communities were short-lived, and all the leaders continued to travel and were frequently banished by political rulers. Major centers of the Inspirationalists were successively at Himbach near Hanau until 1740, the castle of Gelnhausen until 1753, Lieblos, and then Herrnhaag until the 1820s. The second generation of leaders in the 18th century were Wilhelm Ludwig Kampf and Paul Giesebert Nagel.

Gruber stayed for a time with the community of Brethren in Schwarzenau. However, the Inspirationalists found Brethren to be legalistic, sectarian, and sterile in contrast to their own charismatic and prophetic missionary zeal. Ursula Meyer twice prophesied that Brethren leader Alexander Mack was to meet an early death so that he would not continue to burden his co-religionists. She similarly disapproved of Anabaptist Andreas Boni. The groups ended up competing, and poor relations likely spurred the Brethren to leave Schwarzenau for the Netherlands in 1720.

Decline and renewal 

Their religion continued to grow until Gruber and Rock's deaths, but subsequently declined until a reawakening sparked by Michael Krausert, who preached for a revival and had much support.

Migration to North America 

In the 1840s, renewed religious restrictions and requirements from political rulers prompted the Inspirationalists to migrate as a group to North America. Their first settlements were near Buffalo on both sides of the Niagara River. Sites included West Seneca and the Town of Elma. They immediately began practicing community of goods, working in textiles and agriculture. This settlement became known as the Ebenezer Colonies They were soon dismayed to find the area crowded, with the urban presence of growing Buffalo too close and conflicts with the Seneca Indians arising. In 1854, many of the Inspirationists moved to the Iowa River Valley to found the Amana Colonies.

Official membership was 1,534 in 1925, and was more than a thousand as late as the 1980s.

Legacy 

The Community of True Inspiration Residence was listed on the National Register of Historic Places in 2013.

Notable members 
 Conrad Beissel, who joined in 1715 in the German Palatinate, and later founded the Ephrata Cloister
 Barbara Heinemann Landmann
 Christian Metz

See also 
 Pentecostal

References

Sources 
 
 
 

 Statistical Profile of Amana at ARDA

Further reading 
 F. Alan DuVal. Christian Metz: German-American Religious Leader & Pioneer. Ed. Peter Hoehnle. Penfield Books, 2005. 
 
 The Amana Colonies, a National Park Service Discover Our Shared Heritage Travel Itinerary

External links 
Amana Church: The Community of True Inspiration  (official website)
Catechism in German
Catechism in English
Hymnal in German

Amana Colonies
History of Lutheranism
History of Buffalo, New York
Christian new religious movements
Radical Pietism